Jason Smart (born 15 February 1969) is an English former footballer who played as a central defender for Rochdale and Crewe Alexandra.

References

Living people
1969 births
Rochdale A.F.C. players
Crewe Alexandra F.C. players
Barrow A.F.C. players
Witton Albion F.C. players
Footballers from Rochdale
English footballers
Association football defenders